SEA LIFE Brighton is an aquarium attraction in the English city of Brighton. Opened as Brighton Aquarium in 1872, it is the oldest operating aquarium in the world. The attraction was bought by Sea Life in 1991.

History
Designed by Eugenius Birch, the site opened as an independent aquarium in 1872 after construction began in 1869. The construction cost was £133,000 at the time (equal to about £5.5 million). The Aquarium was bombed during the First World War and was reconstructed afterwards.

Brighton Aquarium is the oldest aquarium still operating in the world, the only older aquarium being at Arcachon in France, which opened in 1867.

Conservation and education
To keep in line with Sea Life's "Breed, Rescue, Protect" message, the aquarium has breeding schemes and "The Big Fish" program which helps educate home aquarium owners where to buy fish ethically.

Attractions
Sealife Brighton features over 5,000 sea creatures and over 100 different species.

£2.7 million was spent on an attraction that focuses on an artificial coral reef’s changes through day and night. The site of the project was originally the Aquarium’s dolphinarium.

Location
SEA LIFE Brighton is located next to Brighton Palace Pier.

Transport
It is served by regular buses including: Route 12, 27, 13X, 14, 27 and CityBuzz 37.

Gallery

References

Sea Life Centres
Brighton and Hove
Aquaria in the United Kingdom